From King to a God is the debut solo studio album by American rapper Conway the Machine. It was released on September 11, 2020, by Griselda Records, Drumwork and Empire Distribution. Production was handled by eleven record producers: Beat Butcha, Daringer, Alchemist, DJ Premier, Erick Sermon, Havoc, Hit-Boy, Khrysis, Murda Beatz, Rockwilder and Signalflow Music. It features guest appearances from Armani Caesar, Benny the Butcher, Dej Loaf, El Camino, Flee Lord, Freddie Gibbs, Havoc, Lloyd Banks, Method Man and Westside Gunn. A deluxe version was released on December 18, 2020.

Critical reception

From King to a GOD was met with universal acclaim from music critics. At Metacritic, which assigns a normalized rating out of 100 to reviews from mainstream publications, the album received an average score of 82, based on eight reviews. The aggregator Album of the Year has the critical consensus of the album at a 80 out of 100, based on 8 reviews.

Track listing

Charts

References

External links

2020 debut albums
Conway the Machine albums
Empire Distribution albums
Albums produced by Khrysis
Albums produced by DJ Premier
Albums produced by Rockwilder
Albums produced by Beat Butcha
Albums produced by Murda Beatz
Albums produced by Erick Sermon
Albums produced by Havoc (musician)
Albums produced by Daringer (producer)
Albums produced by the Alchemist (musician)
Albums produced by 9th Wonder
Albums produced by Cardiak
Albums produced by Roc Marciano
Albums produced by Hitmaka
Albums produced by Hit-Boy
Griselda Records albums